Moganopterus is an extinct genus of ctenochasmatid pterosaur from the Early Cretaceous of western Liaoning Province, China.

Discovery and naming
The fossil of Moganopterus was discovered at the village of Xiaosanjiazi near the town of Lamadong in Liaoning Province. In 2012 it was named and described by Lü Junchang, Pu Hanyong, Xu Li, Wu Yanhua and Wei Xuefang as the type species Moganopterus zhuiana. The generic name is derived from the legendary sword couple Gan Jiang and Mo Ye, in reference to the blade-like jaws, and a Latinized Greek πτερόν, pteron, "wing". The specific name honors Ms. Zhu Haifen, who made the specimen available to science.

The holotype, 41HIII0419, was uncovered in a layer of the Yixian Formation, dating from the Aptian, about 125 million years old. It consists of an almost complete skull with lower jaws and the second to fourth neck vertebrae. The fossil is compressed on a slab and counterslab, the splitting of the two plates having damaged some bones. The specimen is part of the collection of the Geological Museum of Henan.

Description
Moganopterus is a large pterosaur. The skull is the largest known of any toothed pterosaur. The size of skull and neck indicates a wingspan of about 7 meters (23 ft), making Moganopterus one of the largest known pterosaurs. (2022).

Apart from the size, the describers established some diagnostic traits. The jaws are very elongated and have straight edges. The total number of teeth in the skull is at least sixty-two. The large skull opening, the fenestra nasoantorbitalis, is rectangular and represents 22% of the snout length. The back of the skull bears a long and narrow parietal crest, sticking out at an angle of 15° to the longitudinal skull axis. Not taking into account the crest, the skull is 11.5 times longer than tall. The neck vertebrae are five times longer than high.

Moganopterus shows an extreme elongation of the upper and lower jaws. The profile of the skull is continued by a narrow crest sticking out at the back, similar to Pteranodon. It is unknown whether this crest was flat or rod-like; its length cannot be determined because it reaches the edge of the slabs. They are about as tall as the snout and have a pointed tip.

The describers estimated there were fifteen teeth in the upper jaw and seventeen in the lower jaw for a total of sixty-four, which closely matches the number of sixty-two actually found. The teeth rows stretch from the very front of the head until the back edge of the fenestra nasoantorbitalis. They are associated with oblique cellular structures visible in the bone of the upper and lower jaws, the nature of which has not been determined. Hollow structures, reinforced by struts, can also be seen in the parietal crest and the vertebrae. The fourth cervical is 7.25 times as long as it is tall.

Phylogeny
In 2012, Moganopterus was assigned to the Boreopteridae, forming a Moganopterinae with its sister taxon Feilongus.

Below is a cladogram from Lü et al. (2012). Only taxa that nest within Ornithocheiroidea are shown.

Cladogram following Longrich, Martill, and Andres, 2018, in which they place Moganopterus within the Ctenochasmatidae instead of the Boreopteridae:

See also
 List of pterosaur genera
 Timeline of pterosaur research

References

Early Cretaceous pterosaurs of Asia
Fossil taxa described in 2012
Ctenochasmatoids
Yixian fauna
Taxa named by Lü Junchang